The General Federation of Japan Printing and Publishing Workers' Unions (Zeninsoren) is a trade union representing workers in the printing industry.

The union was founded in 1953, and affiliated to the General Council of Trade Unions of Japan (Sohyo).  By 1970, it had 18,700 members, but fell to 13,376 by 1985.

In 1989, Sohyo merged into the new Japanese Trade Union Confederation, but Zeninsoren instead opted to join the new National Confederation of Trade Unions.  By 2019, its membership had fallen to 3,286.

References

Printing trade unions
Trade unions established in 1953
Trade unions in Japan